Tapinopa bilineata is a species of sheetweb spider in the family Linyphiidae. It is found in the United States.

References

External links

 

Linyphiidae
Articles created by Qbugbot
Spiders described in 1893